Nikos Nikolopoulos (born 12 June 1999) is a Greek professional footballer who plays as a centre-back for Italian club Campodarsego.

References

1999 births
Living people
Greek expatriate footballers
Serie C players
Serie D players
U.S. Catanzaro 1929 players
A.C.D. Campodarsego players
Association football defenders
Footballers from Athens
Greek footballers